Kathy Lee (or similar variants) may refer to:

Kathy Yaeji Lee or Yaeji (born 1993), Korean-American electronic music artist
Kathie Lee Gifford (born 1953), American television presenter and singer
Cathy Lee Crosby (born 1944),  American actress and former tennis player
Cathy Lee Irwin (born 1952), Canadian figure skater
Cathy Lee Crane (born 1962), film director and producer

See also
Katie Lee (disambiguation)
Katherine Lee (disambiguation)